Tympanopleura atronasus is a species of catfish of the family Auchenipteridae. It can be found in the Amazonas River.

References

Fish described in 1888
Catfish of South America
Taxa named by Carl H. Eigenmann
Taxa named by Rosa Smith Eigenmann